Janaka is a character who appears in the Hindu epic Ramayana. He is an ancient Hindu king of Videha, which was located in the Mithila region. His name at birth was Sīradhvaja, and he had a brother named Kushadhvaja. His father's name was Hrasvaroman, a descendant of the king Nimi. The rulers of the Videha kingdom were accorded the title Janaka, meaning 'father' in Sanskrit, and this character is the best-known bearer of the same.

Janaka is revered as being an ideal example of non-attachment to material possessions. He was intensely interested in spiritual discourse and considered himself free from worldly illusions. His interactions with sages and seekers such as Ashtavakra and Sulabha are recorded in the ancient texts. His relationship with his adopted daughter Sita led her to be called Janaki. The city of Janakpur in Nepal is named after him and his daughter Sita. The Videha (or Mithila) kingdom was historically located between east of Gandaki River, west of Mahananda River, north of the Ganga river and south of the Himalayas.

Ancestry
King Nimi was the first ruler of the Videha kingdom. Janaka was descended from Vishnu in the following order:—Brahmā,—Marīci—Kaśyapa—Vivasvān—Vaivasvata—Ikṣvāku—Nimi—Mithi—Udāvasu—Nandivardhana—Suketu—Devarāta—Bṛhadratha—Mahāvīra—Sudhṛti—Dhṛṣṭaketu—Haryaśva—Maru—Pratvantaka—Kīrtiratha—Devamīḍha—Vibudha—Mahīdhraka—Kīrtirāta—Mahāroman—Svarṇaroman—Hrasvaroman—Sīradhvaja (Janaka).

Janaka in Vedic literature

Late Vedic literature such as Shatapatha Brahmana and Brihadaranyaka Upanishad mention a certain King Janaka (c. 8th or 7th century BCE) as a great philosopher-king of Videha, renowned for his patronage of Vedic culture and philosophy and whose court was an intellectual center for Brahmin sages such as Yajnavalkya, Uddalaka Aruni, and Gargi Vachaknavi. Under his reign, Videha became a dominant political and cultural center of the Indian subcontinent.

Other literature
Janaka is the father of Sita, the wife of Rama in the Hindu epic Ramayana. His conversation with the sage Ashtavakra is recorded in the Ashtavakra Gita, wherein he is depicted as one who is realised and this was tested by the sage Ashtavakra. Many spiritual teachers have referred to this writing often translating and deducing its meaning.

See also
 Kings of Mithila
 Maithils
 Trikaranasuddhi
 Pravahana Jaivali
 Ancient Mithila University

References

Citations

Sources
 Dictionary of Hindu Lord and Legend by Anna Dhallapiccola

7th-century BC Indian monarchs
Characters in the Ramayana